Longyan railway station is a railway station in Xinluo District, Longyan, Fujian, China.

History
The station was opened on 18 January 2003. The station began reconstruction in 2016. On 20 April  2018, a new station building was opened. As part of the project, the number of platforms was increased.

References

Railway stations in Fujian
Railway stations in China opened in 2003